More Nature is a one-disc compilation album of twenty notable New Zealand popular music songs from 2000 to 2005, intended to be a supplement to the Nature's Best series of compilation albums. The song selection for More Nature was not voted on by Australasian Performing Right Association members as were the Top 100 New Zealand Songs of All Time (the Nature's Best list of 100 songs). All of the songs on this album were selected because they had been released after the voting for the Nature's Best song list was conducted. The album was certified platinum.

Track listing
"The Otherside" - Breaks Co-op
"Maybe Tomorrow" - Goldenhorse
"Won't Give In" - The Finn Brothers
"Sophie" - Goodshirt
"Arithmetic" - Brooke Fraser
"Walkie Talkie Man" - Steriogram
"Fools Love" - Misfits of Science
"I Got" - Fast Crew
"Not Many" - Scribe
"Harmonic Generator" - The Datsuns
"Weapons of War" - The Feelers
"Verona" - Elemeno P
"Phlex" - Blindspott
"Misty Frequencies" - Che Fu
"Clav Dub" - Rhombus
"It's On" - Nesian Mystik
"Giddy Up" - Katchafire
"We Gon Ride" - Dei Hamo
"Listening for the Weather" - Bic Runga
"Welcome Home" - Dave Dobbyn

References 
 http://nztop40.co.nz/chart/compilations?chart=1370

Nature's Best
2006 compilation albums
Sony Music New Zealand compilation albums